The  Brahmashirā astra  (a.k.a.  Brahmashirsha O namaka astra) is the most destructive weapon described in the ancient Indian texts, capable to end the existence of gods or Devas. 
It is thought that the Brahmashirā astra is superior than the Brahmāstra, and causes chain reaction of massive explosions and waves to annihilate any desired entity of the Universe or even the Universe itself. The weapon manifests with the four heads of Lord Brahma as its tip. Sage Agnivesha, Lord Parshurama, Pitamah Bhishma, Guru Drona, Arjuna, Karna and Ashwatthama possessed the knowledge to invoke this weapon. This weapon can be invoked into any object, even to a blade of grass.

In the Mahabharata, it is explained that when this weapon is invoked, "It blazes up with terrible flames within a huge sphere of fire. Numerous peals of thunder to be heard, fissures start on earth, rivers become dry, thousands of meteors fell and all living creatures became terrified with great dread. The entire sky seemed to be filled with noise and assumed a terrible aspect with flames of fire. The whole earth with her mountains and waters and trees trembled". When it strikes an area, it will be destroyed and nothing will ever grow there, not even a blade of grass for the next 50 Brahma years (155.5 trillion human years).

See also
Indian epic poetry
Ramayana
Mahabharata
Puranas
Vyūha

References

Weapons in Hindu mythology